Rodney Smith is an American professional skateboarder, entrepreneur, and skate company founder from New York City.

Skateboarding 
Rodney Smith is considered by many to be the Godfather of East Coast skateboarding.

Shut Skates 
Smith founded Shut Skates in 1986 with Bruno Musso. Shut Skates was New York City’s first skate company and the world’s first entirely street skate-based company. Shortly after its founding, Shut Skates moved its operations from Southern California to New York City, due to the urban, street-savvy attitude of the streets of the East Coast, compared to the former's emphasis on surf culture. The brand went dark in the 1990s when Smith co-founded Zoo York with Eli Morgan Gessner and Adam Schatz. SHUT relaunched in 2006, and in 2007, the company reopened their flagship skate shop on the Lower East Side. The storefront space served the community for 10 years, closing in 2017 with the business moving online.

Zoo York 
In 1993, Smith, Eli Morgan Gesner, and Adam Schatz founded Zoo York. In 2019, the trio that founded Zoo York was brought back into the company.

All One Universe 
In the 2010s, Smith founded skate and lifestyle brand ALL ONE, also known as All One Universe.

References 

American skateboarders
African-American skateboarders
Living people
African-American businesspeople
Year of birth missing (living people)
21st-century African-American people